Winkler is a surname. Notable people with the surname include:

A-E
 Albert J. Winkler (1894–1989), American professor of viticulture
 Alberto Winkler (1932–1981)  Italian rower and Olympian
 Alexander Winkler (disambiguation), multiple people
 Angela Winkler (born 1944), German actress
 Angelina Virginia Winkler (1842–1911), American journalist, editor, magazine publisher
Anthony Winkler Prins (1817-1908), Dutch writer and encyclopedist
 Austin John Winkler (born 1981), American singer-songwriter, former lead singer for Hinder
 Ben Winkler (1902–1979), American sound engineer
 Bernhard Winkler (born 1966), German footballer
 Charles Winkler, American film director
 Clemens Winkler (1838–1904), German chemist, discoverer of germanium
 Clinton McKamy Winkler (1821–1882), American politician and Confederate soldier, namesake of Winkler County, Texas
 Dan Winkler (born 1990), American baseball player 
 Emil Winkler (1835–1888), German engineer
 Eric Winkler (1920–1995), Canadian politician
 Eugen Gottlob Winkler (1912–1936), German essayist

F-J
 Frank Winkler, American astronomer
 Gerhard Winkler (disambiguation), multiple people
 Gernot M. R. Winkler (1922-2016), time measurement specialist at USNO
 Gus Winkler (1901-1933), American gangster and associate of Al Capone
 Gustav Winkler (1867–1954), German industrialist
 Hans Winkler (1877–1945), German botanist
 Hans Günter Winkler (1926-2018), German show jumping rider
 Hans-Heinrich Winkler, East German luger
 Harald Winkler (born 1962), Austrian bobsledder
 Harry Winkler (disambiguation), multiple people
 Heinrich August Winkler (born 1938), German historian
 Helmut Gustav Franz Winkler (1915–1980), German geologist
 Henry Winkler (born 1945), American actor
 Hermann Winkler (born 1963), German politician and Member of the European Parliament
 Hubert Winkler (1875–1941), German botanist
 Irwin Winkler (born 1931), American film producer and director
 Jim Winkler (American football) (1927–2001), American footballer
 Jim Winkler, leading member of the United Methodist Church
 Joe Winkler (1922–2001), American football player
 John E. Winkler (1941–2007), American author and photographer
 John J. Winkler (1943-1990), American philologist and Benedictine monk
 Johannes Winkler (1897–1947), German rocket pioneer
 Jonathan Reed Winkler (born 1975), American historian 
 Josef Winkler (disambiguation), multiple people

K-O
 Kati Winkler (born 1974), German figure skater
 Konrad Winkler (skier) (born 1955), East German Nordic combined skier
 Konrad Winkler (fencer) (1882–1962), Polish fencer
 Lajos Winkler (1863–1939), Hungarian chemist, a.k.a. Ludwig Wilhelm Winkler, who developed Winkler titration
 Malcolm Winkler, American biologist 
 Margaret J. Winkler (1895–1990), American animator
 Margo Winkler (born 1930s), American actress
 Mary Winkler (born 1973), American murderer
 Matthew Winkler (disambiguation), multiple people
 Max Winkler (1875–1961), German Reich Trustee and Reich Commissioner for German Cinema
 Mel Winkler (1941–2020), American actor
 Mike Winkler, American politician
 Myra Carroll Winkler (1880-1963), American educator and politician

P-T
 Paul Winkler (director) (born 1939), German film director active in Australia
 Paul Winkler (publisher) (1898–1982), Jewish-Hungarian journalist, writer, publisher active in France
 Paul Winkler (footballer) (1913–1996), German soccer player
 Peter Winkler, American mathematician
 Ralf Winkler (1939-2017), also known as A. R. Penck, German painter
 Randy Winkler (born 1943), American football player
 Ronny Winkler (born 1971), German figure skater
 Rudy Winkler (born 1994), American Olympic track and field athlete
 Scott Winkler, American Paralympic track and field athlete
 Sieglinde Winkler (born 1966), Austrian alpine skier
 Tiberius Cornelis Winkler (1822–1897), Dutch anatomist and paleontologist

U-Z
 Vladimir Winkler (1884–1956), Czech and Russian sculptor
 Wilhelm Winkler (1884-1984), Bohemian and Austrian statistician
 Wolfgang Winkler (1940-2001), German luger

See also
 Potato Germans
 Winckler

German-language surnames